Claude Nahon, (20 April 1933 – 11 September 2016), better known as Claude-Jean Philippe, was a French film critic, essayist, diarist, director, and producer who realized numerous documentaries. He was also active on the radio. Occasionally, he was also a screenwriter or an actor.

Publications 	
1984: Le Roman du cinéma, Fayard, 
1985: Métropolis : images d'un tournage, Cinémathèque française,
1985: Simone Signoret, Hachette,
1984: Le Roman du cinéma. Tome 2, Fayard, 
1986: Une nuit chez les Marx, Dargaud, 
1986: Studio Harcourt : acteurs, Seghers 
1987: Le Roman de Charlot, Fayard,
1987: Cannes, le festival, Nathan,
1988: François Truffaut, Seghers, 
1989: Jean Cocteau, Seghers,
1990: Le Journal d'un cinéphile, Éd. Filipacchi, 
1994: La Douce Gravité du désir : roman, Presses de la Cité, 
1996: La Nuit bienfaisante, Éditions du Rocher, 
2006: Jean Renoir, une vie en œuvres, Grasset,
2008: , Cahiers du cinéma,

Filmography

Actor 
 1972: L'Amour l'après-midi
 1980: Le Rôle effacé de Marie
 1991: 
 2002: Inconnu à cette adresse
 2004: Ne quittez pas !

Screenwriter 
 1960:  (commentary)
 1964: Les Baisers
 1970: La Brigade des maléfices
 1974: Une légende, une vie : Citizen Welles

Director 
 1966: Et pourtant ils tournent (documentaire, dans la série )
 1973: Les Gens de Belleville, légende de Belleville (documentaire, dans la série L'Album de famille des Français)
 1978: Encyclopédie audiovisuelle du cinéma (documentaire en six épisodes) :
 Max Linder
 Le cinéma en son temps : Les années dix ou le temps de l'hécatombe
 Le cinéma forain
 Méliès ou le génie de la surprise
 Lumière ou le cinématographe 
 1994: Léo Ferré par lui-même (montage d'archives)

Producer 
 1970: Postface Dalio
 1978: Encyclopédie audiovisuelle du cinéma

References

External links 
 

1933 births
2016 deaths
French film critics
French directors
French screenwriters
French radio producers
French radio presenters
French essayists
Commandeurs of the Ordre des Arts et des Lettres
People from Tangier